Xavier Bécas (born 31 May 1979 in Tarbes) is a French professional football player.

He played on the professional level in Ligue 1 for CS Sedan Ardennes and AC Ajaccio and in Ligue 2 for AC Ajaccio, FC Metz, FC Gueugnon and FC Istres.

1979 births
Living people
Sportspeople from Tarbes
French footballers
Ligue 1 players
Ligue 2 players
CS Sedan Ardennes players
AC Ajaccio players
FC Metz players
FC Gueugnon players
FC Istres players
Pau FC players
Tarbes Pyrénées Football players
Association football midfielders